Naples is a major city and province in Italy.

Naples may also refer to:

Places

Italy
 Naples International Airport, IATA code NAP
 Port of Naples
 Duchy of Naples, a former duchy
 Gulf of Naples, the bay off the coast of Naples
 Kingdom of Naples, a former kingdom
 Metropolitan City of Naples
 Kingdom of Naples (Napoleonic), a former French client state

United States
 Naples, Long Beach, California
 Naples, Florida
 Naples Airport (Florida)
 Naples Historic District
 Naples High School
 Naples, Idaho
 Naples, Illinois
 Naples, Maine
 Naples (CDP), Maine
 Naples, New York
 Naples (village), New York
 Naples, South Dakota
 Naples, Texas
 Naples, Utah
 Naples, Wisconsin
 Naples Creek, a stream in San Mateo County, California
 Naples Reef, a reef located off the coast of Santa Barbara, California

Other places
 Naples, Alberta, Canada
 Naples, the Roman name for the biblical city of Shechem, pronounced Nablus in Arabic

People 
 Al Naples (1926-2021), an American Major League Baseball shortstop
 Nancy Naples (politician), member of the AMTRAK Board of Directors
 Nancy Naples (sociologist), American sociologist

Other uses
 Epyc Naples, the first generation of AMD's Epyc line of server processors, codenamed Naples

See also 
 Napoli (disambiguation)
 Neapoli (disambiguation)
 Neapolitan (disambiguation)